Herman J. Hauck, S.J. was appointed Santa Clara University's 23rd president after the presidency of William C. Gianera.

References

Sources
 California Historical Society Quarterly Coverage: 1922-1970 (Vols. 1-49) 
 Gerald McKevitt, S.J. The University of Santa Clara: A History, 1851-1977 (Page 385)

External links
 https://web.archive.org/web/20101221032157/http://scu.edu/president/history/past.cfm

1816 births
1897 deaths
19th-century Italian Jesuits
Presidents of Santa Clara University